A BLS digital signature—also known as Boneh–Lynn–Shacham (BLS)—is a cryptographic signature scheme which allows a user to verify that a signer is authentic. 

The scheme uses a bilinear pairing for verification, and signatures are elements of an elliptic curve group. Working in an elliptic curve group provides some defense against index calculus attacks (with the caveat that such attacks are still possible in the target group  of the pairing), allowing shorter signatures than FDH signatures for a similar level of security. 

Signatures produced by the BLS signature scheme are often referred to as short signatures, BLS short signatures, or simply BLS signatures. The signature scheme is provably secure (the scheme is existentially unforgeable under adaptive chosen-message attacks) in the random oracle model assuming the intractability of the computational Diffie–Hellman problem in a gap Diffie–Hellman group.

Pairing functions

A gap group is a group in which the computational Diffie–Hellman problem is intractable but the decisional Diffie–Hellman problem can be efficiently solved. Non-degenerate, efficiently computable, bilinear pairings permit such groups.

Let  be a non-degenerate, efficiently computable, bilinear pairing where ,  are groups of prime order, . Consider an instance of the CDH problem,, . Intuitively, the pairing function  does not help us compute , the solution to the CDH problem. It is conjectured that this instance of the CDH problem is intractable.

By using the bilinear property  times, we see that if , then, since  is a prime order group, .

BLS signature scheme
A signature scheme consists of three functions: generate, sign, and verify.

Key generation
The holder of the private key publishes the public key, .

Signing
We output the signature .

Verification
Given a signature  and a public key , we verify that .

Properties
Simple Threshold Signatures
Signature Aggregation: Multiple signatures generated under multiple public keys for multiple messages can be aggregated into a single signature.
Unique and deterministic: for a given key and message, there is only one valid signature (like RSA PKCS1 v1.5, EdDSA and unlike RSA PSS, DSA, ECDSA and Schnorr).

Applications

 Chia network has used BLS signatures
 By 2020, BLS signatures were used extensively in version 2 (Eth2) of the Ethereum blockchain, as specified in the IETF draft BLS signature specification—for cryptographically assuring  that a specific Eth2 validator has actually verified a particular transaction.  The use of BLS signatures in Ethereum is considered a solution to the verification bottleneck only for the medium term, as BLS signatures are not quantum secure.  Over the longer term—say, 2025–2030—STARK aggregation is expected to be a drop-in replacement for BLS aggregation.

See also
Pairing-based cryptography

References

External links
Summary description of the Algorand draft standard effort
Ben Lynn's PBC Library
Chia Network's BLS signatures implementation (C++)

Digital signature schemes

Pairing-based cryptography